The 2005–06 HockeyAllsvenskan season was the first season of the HockeyAllsvenskan, the second level of ice hockey in Sweden. The season originally featured 16 teams, but due to Halmstad Hammers HC's bankruptcy mid-season in November 2005, the season only featured 15 teams. The top four teams qualified for the Kvalserien, with the opportunity to be promoted to the Elitserien.

Participating teams

Regular season

Kvalserien

Relegation round

*Due to Halmstad Hammers HC's bankruptcy, the relegation round's third-place team, Hammarby IF, also qualified for the following HockeyAllsvenskan season.

External links
 Season on hockeyarchives.info

Swe
HockeyAllsvenskan seasons
2005–06 in Swedish ice hockey leagues